Sterrhini is a tribe of the geometer moth family (Geometridae), with about 825 species in 19 genera. There are also 6 genera with 36 species tentatively associated with the tribe. The tribe was erected by Edward Meyrick in 1892.

Genera
Anthometra Boisduval, 1840
Arcobara Walker, 1863
Brachyglossina Wagner, 1914
Cleta Duponchel, 1845
Emmiltis Hübner, 1825
Epicleta Prout, 1915
Euacidalia Packard, 1873
Eueupithecia Prout, 1910
Eumacrodes Warren, 1905
Eupithecidia Hampson, 1895
Idaea Treitschke, 1825
Lobocleta Warren, 1906
Odontoptila Warren, 1897
Paota Hulst, 1896
Protoproutia McDunnough, 1939
Ptychamalia Prout, 1932
Tineigidia Sterneck, 1934

Uncertain association
Aphanophleps Warren, 1906
Limeria Staudinger, 1892
Lophophleps Hampson, 1891
Lycaugidia Hampson, 1895
Notiosterrha Prout, 1932
Stenorrhoe Warren, 1900
Tricentrogyna Prout, 1932
Trichosterrha Warren, 1904

References